Radebeul-Naundorf station is a railway station in the Naundorf district in the Große Kreisstadt of Radebeul, Saxony, Germany.

References

Naundorf